Cynthia Zukas is a Zambian painter; she received the Order of the British Empire in 2012.

Zukas was born in 1931 in Cape Town, South Africa. She went to school in South Africa, where she started her art career, and later went to London where she studied as an art teacher. In London, she met Simon Zukas who she later married.

Career
After a few years, Simon and Cynthia moved to Zambia and Cynthia became a full-time housewife. The two have two children. During her free time, she used to draw, which she still does today. A few years after coming to Zambia, she was introduced to the Lusaka Art Society. This is where she met different artists and became the secretary of the society. It was later that she cofounded the Lechwe Trust, an organization aimed at developing visual arts in Zambia. She also played a big role in the Zambia National Visual Arts Council (VAC).

Some of the artists that she notes who have contributed to the Zambia's art are Henry Tayali and Valentine Musakanya. It is through her artwork that Cynthia earned herself international recognition even among westerners

Awards

References

External links
 

Zambian women
Zambian painters
Members of the Order of the British Empire
1931 births
Living people
People from Cape Town